Arzu Toker (born 1952) is a German-speaking writer, journalist, publicist and translator of Turkish descent.

Biography 
Toker was born in 1952 in Halfeti, Turkey. She moved to Germany in 1974, where she has lived ever since.

Early 2007, she and Mina Ahadi were amongst the founders of the Central Council of Ex-Muslims, a German association that aims to represent people who have renounced Islam. Toker opines that Islam is inhumane, contrary to the German Constitution and both misogynous and misandrous: according to her, women in Islam are being "degraded to breeding machines". She warns that in many Dutch cities there are women's and day care centres in the hands of Islamists. By allowing this Islamic pillarisation, the Netherlands are too tolerant in Toker's view. For her, Islam stands for oppression, and one should be allowed to say that, naming Ayaan Hirsi Ali as their example.

Works

Fiction 
 Various performers: live-recording of a narratots`night on castle Schloss Burg, May 1999; WDR / Villa Ohl / Akademie Remscheid 1999
 „Samt und Seide“ (Velvet and silk), in: Niki Eideneier (Ed.): ... die Visionen deiner Liebeslust – Liebe und Erotik in der Fremde, Romiosini – Verlag, Köln, 1995

Journalistic 
 „Kein Schritt zurück“, Alibri, Aschaffenburg 2014
 „Frauen sind eure Äcker“, by Ilhan Arsel und Arzu Toker, Alibri (Mai 2012)
 Kalimerhaba: griechisch-deutsch-türkisches Lesebuch (with Niki Eideneier); Köln 1992
 Rassismus und Südberichterstattung: Kriterien für Medienkritik und Berichterstattung / Media Watch, Heinrich-Böll-Stiftung e.V., Dritte-Welt-Journalisten-Netz e.V. Koordinationsausschuss, Köln 1994
 Simone Derix – Dokumentation und Auswertung der Berichterstattung in Printmedien über die 4. Weltfrauenkonferenz in Beijing vom 4. bis zum 15. September 1995 (Co-author); Cologne 1995
 Ilhan Arsel – Juden und Christen im Koran (auch Übersetzung), Norderstedt 2006
 „Tschardak“ in: Kölner Symphonie, Autoren in Athen, Romiosini Verlag, Athen, 1993
 „Es gilt das gehaltene Wort, Grußworte an den verstorbenen Schriftsteller Heinrich Böll“, Demokratie in Gefahr? Hrsg. Rainer Schneider- Wilkes, Westfälischer Dampfbootverlag, 1995
 „In der Fremde sind wir noch abhängiger vom Mann“, Stuttgarter Zeitung, 1981
 „Zwischen staatlicher und alltäglicher Diskriminierung“, in: Türken Raus ?, Rolf Meinhardt (Ed.) Rowohlt, 1984
 „Ausländische Frauen“, Blätter der Wohlfahrtspflege, 1991
 „Usbekistan- Die Wahrheit hat viele Gesichter“in: VHS, Zeitschrift des Deutschen Volkshochschul-Verbandes, 1992
 „Die Deutschen haben den Nationalismus nicht gepachtet“, „Amerika noch einmal entdecken?“ Wir aktuell, Köln. Informationsblatt des Forums für besseres Verständnis zwischen Deutschen und Ausländern, 1992
 „Liebe Freundinnen des Kopftuchs“, Emma July/August 93
 „Eurozentristisches Feindbild oder Kritik am Islam?“ Sozialwissenschaftliche Forschung u. Praxis für Frauen ev (Hrsg.): BEITRÄGE zur feministischen Theorie u. Praxis, 1993
 „Ausländer in den Medien- Perspektiven, Kritik und Ausblick“, Ausländer und Medien, Documentation of Bremische Landesmedienanstalt, 1993
 „Der ethnozentrische Blick“ In: Beate Winkler (Hrsg.): Was heißt denn hier fremd?. Humboldt Verlag, 1994
 „Die Selbstverständlichkeit des Seins“, Agenda, Zeitschrift für Medien, Bildung, Kultur, 1995
 „Krieg per Fernseher“, Stadtrevue Cologne, 1995
 „Italienische Sexbomben, türkische Kopftuchfrauen und andere Exotinnen: Migrantinnen im deutschen Fernsehen“ in: Verwaschen und verschwommen, Bärbel Röben/C.Wilß (Ed.) Brandes u. Apsel Verlag, 1996
 „Die Ehre ist verbrannt“, comment on the arson attack in Krefeld, TAZ, 1997
 More articles in: Ost/West Wochenzeitung, der Freitag and TAZ („Hundert Jahre Schweigen“ „Die Morde von Sivas“ „Wir haben keine Nation“ „Mohammeds Rache“)
 „Zehn Gründe, aus dem Islam auszutreten“ (2007)

Radio 
 Politische Morde in der Türkei, am Beispiel von Ugur Mumcu, Journalist. Research for ARTE, Themed evening and Moderation of the feature
 Deutschland aber wusste nichts von seinem Glück. Feature, Westdeutscher Rundfunk (SWR), Editing: Nadja Odeh, broadcast 2 December 2004, 10.05 h, 23’56’

Recitations 
 „Der Prophet und die Frau im Koran“, Ev. Kirche/AWO Lippstadt, 2004
 „Die Zukunft in meinen Händen“, Remember for the Future, conference in Berlin, 1991
 „Erzähl mir wie dein Land Einwanderer behandelt und ich sage Dir, welches Land es ist“, Meeting by Wir Forum in coordination with Landesinstitut für Schule u. Weiterbildung, Soest, 1992
 „Fremde Heimat- Heimat in der Fremde“, Volkshochschule Leverkusen, 1994
 „Vergangenheits-‚Bewältigung‘ in der deutschen Sprache“, International Society for the Comparative Study of Civilizations, event organized by the University of Minnesota, USA in Dublin, 1994
 „Reinland oder raus?“, discussion in Mayersche Buchhandlung, 1995
 „Die Zukunft gehört der Migration!“, Angelockt vom Geruch der Freiheit, Sunday matinee in the townhall of Delmenhorst, 1995
 „Entführung in den Serail. Weiblicher Alltag im Islam zwischen Legende u. Wirklichkeit“, Talkshow with music, film literature imbedded in the exposition „Im Lichte des Halbmonds“, Kunst u. Ausstellungshalle der Bundesrepublik Deutschland, 1996
 „Tropisches Deutschland“, public library Stuttgart, 1996
 „Minderheiten in den Medien“, Kreuzberg Museum, 1997
 „Nationalismus und die Migration“, 1998, Basel
 „Fürchte Dich vor dem der ein einziges Buch liest“, FDP Berlin, subject Europe and Islam, 1999
 „Die Identität der Deutschen und Einwanderer im Spiegelbild der Migration“, Berkeley University, San Francisco, 1999
 „Minderheiten in Deutschland, Recht und Identität“, Stanford University, 1999
 „Migration als Befreiung“, Gustav Stresemann Institut, 1999

References

External links 
  Website of Arzu Toker

Turkish writers
Turkish journalists
Turkish atheists
German atheists
German journalists
German women writers
1952 births
Living people
Former Muslim critics of Islam
Turkish former Muslims
German former Muslims
German critics of Islam
Turkish emigrants to West Germany
Former Muslims turned agnostics or atheists